Dante Daniel Bonaduce (born August 13, 1959) is an American radio personality, actor, television personality, and professional wrestler. Bonaduce is the son of veteran TV writer and producer Joseph Bonaduce (The Dick Van Dyke Show, One Day at a Time, and others). Bonaduce became famous as a child actor of the 1970s on the TV sitcom The Partridge Family. He co-starred as Danny Partridge, the wisecracking, redheaded middle son of the singing family band (headed by Shirley Jones), and he portrayed the fictional pop group's bass guitar player.

Since then, Bonaduce has starred in several other TV series, including the VH1 reality show Breaking Bonaduce in 2005, radio shows in Los Angeles and Philadelphia and has been hosting a morning talk/music show at Seattle radio station KZOK-FM since November 14, 2011.

Early life
By his own account, Bonaduce grew up in a dysfunctional family and suffered severe physical and emotional abuse at the hands of his father, TV writer and producer Joseph Bonaduce, while his mother Betty could only stand by helplessly.

Career

Acting

Bonaduce made a small appearance in the Bewitched season 5 episode "Going Ape", which aired on February 27, 1969, as a young boy in the park whose chimpanzee follows Samantha (Elizabeth Montgomery) and Tabitha (Erin Murphy) home.

Danny Bonaduce had a substantial role on The Ghost & Mrs. Muir on the first-season episode Jonathan Tells It Like It Was, aired March 1, 1969. He played competitor Danny Shoemaker in a history essay contest with Mrs. Muir's son Jonathan. Danny's father Joseph Bonaduce wrote the episode.

In The Partridge Family Bonaduce played the role of Danny Partridge, a member of the musical Partridge family. In the show, the Partridges were a family band that toured the country in their hip, Mondrian-inspired, painted school bus. Danny Partridge played bass guitar for the band and his younger siblings, Tracy and Chris, contributed to the band as percussionists. The series ran for four seasons, from 1970 to 1974 and, in 2003, Bonaduce was honored by the Young Artist Foundation with its Former Child Star "Lifetime Achievement" Award for his role on the series.

Bonaduce made several movies during and after the run of The Partridge Family, including Corvette Summer (1978) starring Mark Hamill. Hamill and Bonaduce played high school students who went in search of a stolen customized Corvette Stingray. Bonaduce also made guest appearances on several TV shows, including the television action drama CHiPs. His career withered in the early 1980s.

Bonaduce and Partridge Family co-star Dave Madden made cameo appearances in a 1994 episode of Married... with Children. That same year, he appeared on an episode of Space Ghost Coast to Coast. He has also guest-starred in the first two episodes of the seventh season of CSI: Crime Scene Investigation and as the son of Shirley Jones's character in the fourth season of The Drew Carey Show. Bonaduce has appeared as himself on the detective series Monk and on the show Girlfriends. Bonaduce guest-starred with J. D. Roth (with whom he would later reunite for Breaking Bonaduce) on a celebrity episode of Sex Wars. In 1999, Bonaduce appeared in the Christmas episode, "Sabrina, Nipping at Your Nose", of Sabrina, the Teenage Witch.

During his radio work, Bonaduce was the host of the segment "Bonaduce's Buzz" as part of WMAQ-TV's morning newscast First Thing in The Morning with Art Norman and Allison Rosati in 1994; but he left the station the following year to concentrate on his syndicated talk show.

During the 1995–96 TV season, Bonaduce was the host of Danny!, a syndicated talk show featuring the house band The Critics.

From 2001 to 2003, Bonaduce co-hosted The Other Half, a daytime talk show positioned as a complementary show to The View, on which he starred with Mario Lopez, Dick Clark, and cosmetic surgeon Dr. Jan Adams (who was later replaced by actor Dorian Gregory). During this time, he was also a Hollywood correspondent for the Australian morning show Today.

In 2005, Bonaduce starred in Breaking Bonaduce a VH1 reality show about his turbulent life with his wife Gretchen.

In 2006, he had a recurring role in the crime scene drama CSI as a character known as Izzy Delancy – a once great, but philandering, rock star, the victim of the infamous miniature killer. He also hosted the short-lived tabloid-themed game show Starface, on Game Show Network. In 2007, Bonaduce was both host and judge of the show I Know My Kid's a Star, a reality show on VH1 featuring parents and children trying to break into show business. He also appeared as a judge on the Australian version of the show, My Kid's a Star.

Bonaduce, admitting his own less-than-stellar track record, was a commentator for TruTV's TruTV Presents: World's Dumbest... from 2008 to 2013.

Radio and music
Bonaduce's self-titled debut LP was released in 1973 by Lion Records, a subsidiary label of MGM Records. The single from the album, "Dreamland" was a minor hit.

In the late 1980s, Bonaduce had become an on-air radio personality. He worked an overnight shift at Philadelphia's WEGX-FM. From 1994 to 1996, Bonaduce hosted his own radio show, The Danny Bonaduce Show on The Loop WLUP in Chicago. Between 1996 and 1998, Bonaduce hosted a morning radio show in Detroit on WKQI with comedian and Last Comic Standing winner John Heffron. In 1998 Bonaduce was the morning show host for New York City's Big 105 WBIX for a brief period.

Bonaduce was part of The Adam Carolla Show in 2007. In 2008 he was given a daily one-hour solo spot known as Broadcasting Bonaduce, which was broadcast locally on the L.A.-based KLSX station. In February 2009, it was announced that the station had changed its format from talk to Top 40, and the removal of Broadcasting Bonaduce from the KLSX schedule was confirmed.

On October 31, 2011, it was announced by Seattle radio station 102.5 KZOK that Bonaduce would be co-hosting their morning-drive show beginning on November 14, 2011.  Bonaduce came to Seattle from a radio stint at 94 WYSP in Philadelphia, following a format change from classic rock to all sports radio in September 2011. On April 29, 2022, Bonaduce announced that he was taking a temporary medical leave from his Seattle radio show to pursue treatment for an undisclosed illness.

Bonaduce is an ordained minister; he was ordained online in order to perform a wedding ceremony as part of a 94WYSP radio promotion in early 2011.

Altercation with Jonny Fairplay
On October 2, 2007, Bonaduce was involved in an altercation with Survivor show participant Jonny Fairplay during the Fox Reality Awards. Toward the end of the awards show, Fairplay appeared onstage and was booed by the audience. Bonaduce walked on stage and explained that the audience reaction was "because they hate you." Bonaduce was walking off the stage as Fairplay called him back. Fairplay then jumped on Bonaduce to hug him and Bonaduce stated later that he was uncomfortable with Fairplay's hands near his throat. Bonaduce, a black belt in Tang Soo Do, adjusted his balance and grip, and threw Fairplay over his head. Fairplay fell to the floor, face first, unable to halt his fall with his hands due to the microphone he was holding. Fairplay stood up after a few moments and staggered before slowly walking off stage, his back to the audience. Bonaduce then smiled and proceeded to make faces and exaggerated shrugging motions at the audience before walking off stage.

Bonaduce later said the two had never had any negative interactions before that incident, but that they had met occasionally in the past. He said he had never liked Fairplay, mostly because Fairplay, true to his form, had lied about his grandmother's death during his first run on Survivor. While Bonaduce did not believe Fairplay was significantly hurt at the time, TMZ.com confirmed that Fairplay bled significantly, lost some teeth and suffered a broken toe. Fairplay pressed charges, and a felony battery investigation was opened by the police. On October 5, 2007, the L.A. District Attorney's office concluded that there was insufficient evidence to prove Bonaduce had committed battery, because the contact had been initiated by Fairplay and Bonaduce had acted in self-defense.

Boxing and wrestling
As an adult, Bonaduce boxed Donny Osmond and former Brady Barry Williams in separate charity events. Bonaduce won both fights, gaining a decision over Osmond and a TKO over Williams. On June 11, 2007, it was announced that Bonaduce would box attorney Robert Shapiro for a charitable event.

On September 13, 2008, Bonaduce defeated "Reverend" Bob Levy by a TKO in the second one-minute round of a planned three-round fight. Prior to the event, Levy had slapped Bonaduce while visiting Bonaduce's dressing room.

It was announced in early January 2009 that Bonaduce would box retired baseball player José Canseco at a charity event in the Philadelphia area. Bonaduce reportedly trained for the fight in Sacramento, California with boxer Angelo Núñez. On January 24, 2009, Bonaduce and Canseco fought to a majority draw.

In April 1994, it was announced that Bonaduce would be making his professional wrestling debut in a "dark match" at the Spring Stampede in Chicago. On April 17, 1994, Bonaduce stepped into the ring at the Rosemont Horizon. His opponent was another 1970s TV star, the Brady Bunch's Christopher Knight. Bonaduce won. Bonaduce had his second professional wrestling match at Total Nonstop Action Wrestling's April pay-per-view event Lockdown against Eric Young, which he lost. Bonaduce was a key player in the series Hulk Hogan's Celebrity Championship Wrestling.

Writing
In 2002, Bonaduce released an autobiography, Random Acts of Badness.

Personal life

Bonaduce has a black belt in karate.

Bonaduce married his first wife, Setsuko Hattori in 1985, and they divorced in 1988.

On November 4, 1990, Bonaduce met second wife Gretchen Hillmer on a blind date and, on a whim, they married the same day. Despite the unusual start to the marriage, the two remained married for over sixteen years and had two children together. On April 9, 2007, the two divorced, citing irreconcilable differences.

Bonaduce began dating his current wife, Amy Railsback, in April 2007. They met at a Starbucks in the Los Angeles area. Railsback, who is 23 years his junior, is a former substitute school teacher. She now manages Bonaduce's career full-time, runs Gravel Tones Productions Inc, and is occasionally seen in sketches on The Smoking Gun Presents: World's Dumbest... on truTV. He proposed to Amy in March 2009, and the couple married on November 22, 2010, at the Four Seasons on Maui, Hawaii. They maintain homes in both Los Angeles and in Seattle.

Bonaduce and David Cassidy, his The Partridge Family costar, remained close friends until Cassidy's death on November 21, 2017. On January 20, 2018, Bonaduce attended Cassidy's memorial service in Los Angeles. Bonaduce also met actress Shirley Jones on the set of The Partridge Family. Jones often allowed Bonaduce to stay at her home in order to avoid his difficult home life. According to Jones, Bonaduce was "smart" and "talented" but a troublemaker off-camera, who "was still a kid and would do kid things like get a dish of food and throw it across the room or have a pillow fight". Bonaduce later commented that "Shirley Jones could not have been kinder to me".

Arrests
On March 9, 1990, he was arrested while attempting to buy cocaine in Daytona Beach, Florida. Bonaduce was there to host an event for D.A.R.E., an anti-drug campaign aimed at children. Bonaduce was eventually fired from WEGX. He later became the morning shift DJ at KKFR-FM in Phoenix, Arizona.

On March 31, 1991, Bonaduce was arrested in Phoenix for beating and robbing Darius Barney, a transvestite sex worker; "authorities said the victim suffered a broken nose and a cut to his face." Soon after, he was fired from KKFR. In July of the same year, Bonaduce pleaded guilty to reduced charges. Amongst his punishments, he was required to pay Barney's medical bills. Later that same year, Bonaduce returned to WEGX in Philadelphia.

Political views
Bonaduce has expressed his mostly conservative political views during guest appearances. He is a strong supporter of capital punishment and a strong military. Several controversial statements have been made by Bonaduce regarding left-wing or liberal celebrities, such as his remarks that Jane Fonda should have been shot for treason for her role in support of the North Vietnamese Army and Viet Cong during the Vietnam War. He also stated on MSNBC's Scarborough Country that "personally I think at this point if anyone had a rope thick enough, I think that Rosie should be strung up for treason", referring to Rosie O'Donnell.

Filmography

Film

Television

References

Further reading 
 Dye, David. Child and Youth Actors: Filmography of Their Entire Careers, 1914–1985. Jefferson, NC: McFarland & Co., 1988, p. 23.

External links

 
 
 
 Interview with Danny, and more about the music.
 When Young Stars Burn Out MSN
 Jan 10 2009 Audio Interview with In Your Head

1959 births
20th-century American male actors
American game show hosts
American male child actors
American male professional wrestlers
American male television actors
American male voice actors
American radio personalities
American people of Italian descent
American male karateka
California Republicans
Living people
Male actors from Los Angeles
Male actors from Pennsylvania
Participants in American reality television series
Pennsylvania Republicans
People from Marple Township, Pennsylvania
Professional wrestlers from Pennsylvania
Radio personalities from Philadelphia